It's Just Begun is the second album by the Jimmy Castor Bunch, released in 1972 on RCA Records.<ref name="Allmusic">It's Just Begun at [ Allmusic]</ref> "It's Just Begun" and "Troglodyte (Cave Man)" have each become staples in hip-hop sampling. Songs from the album have been sampled more than twenty-five times. The song is considered by some to be one of the first disco songs.

The album hit #11 on the R&B charts and #27 on the Billboard 200. "Troglodyte (Cave Man)" hit #6 on the Billboard Hot 100 and #4 R&B.

"Troglodyte (Cave Man)" has made its impact felt as well, making its way onto more than 20 compilation albums, ranging from 16 Slabs of Funk to Greatest Soul Groups''.

Reception

Track listing
 "Creation (Prologue)" (Gerry Thomas) - 1:34
 "It's Just Begun" (Gerry Thomas, Jimmy Castor, John Pruitt) - 3:43
 "Troglodyte (Cave Man)" (Jimmy Castor Bunch) - 3:36
 "You Better Be Good (Or the Devil Gon' Getcha)" (Gerry Thomas, Jimmy Castor, John Pruitt) - 2:56
 "Psyche" (Jimmy Castor Bunch) - 4:25
 "L.T.D. (Life, Truth and Death)" (Gerry Thomas, Curtis Knight) - 7:20
 "My Brightest Day" (Gerry Thomas, Jimmy Castor, John Pruitt) - 4:03
 "Bad" (Gerry Thomas, Jimmy Castor, John Pruitt, Doug Gibson) - 3:04
 "I Promise to Remember" (Jimmy Castor, Jimmy Smith) - 2:47
 "Creation (Epilogue)" (Gerry Thomas) - 1:02

Personnel
The Jimmy Castor Bunch
Jimmy Castor - Saxophone, Timbales, Vocals
Doug Gibson - Bass, Backing Vocals
Harry Jensen - Guitar
Lenny Fridie, Jr. - Congas
Gerry Thomas - Trumpet, Piano
Orchestra of 30 musicians in "Creation" (Prologue and Epilogue)

Charts

Singles

External links
 Jimmy Castor Bunch-It's Just Begun at Discogs

References

1972 debut albums
RCA Records albums
Funk albums by American artists